Tin Yuet Estate is a public housing estate in Tin Shui Wai, New Territories, Hong Kong, near Light Rail Tin Yuet stop. It consists of six residential buildings completed in 2000 and 2002 respectively.

Houses

Demographics
According to the 2016 by-census, Tin Yuet Estate had a population of 11,811. The median age was 40.8 and the majority of residents (96.4 per cent) were of Chinese ethnicity. The average household size was 3 people. The median monthly household income of all households (i.e. including both economically active and inactive households) was HK$23,150.

Politics
Tin Yuet Estate is located in Yuet Yan constituency of the Yuen Long District Council. It was formerly represented by Hong Chin-wah, who was elected in the 2019 elections until July 2021.

See also

Public housing estates in Tin Shui Wai

References

Tin Shui Wai
Public housing estates in Hong Kong
Residential buildings completed in 2000
Residential buildings completed in 2002
2002 establishments in Hong Kong